Heather Ruth Wolfe  (born 1971) is an American curator of manuscripts and archivist at the Folger Shakespeare Library. A "Shakespeare detective", she has been noted for her research into the history of the Shakespeare coat of arms. She headed "Shakespeare Documented", a project to make contemporary texts involving Shakespeare available online, and is involved in the similar "Early Modern Manuscripts Online" (EMMO) project.

At the Folger, her "Project Dustbunny" has yielded significant results from human cells gathered from 17th-century volumes.

Wolfe was elected as a Fellow of the Society of Antiquaries of London on 16 February 2023.

Books

References

External links
 Heather Wolfe at The Collation, a Folger Shakespeare Library blog
 Heather Wolfe at Rare Book School
 See an illustrated manuscript of 16th-century coats of arms, including commentary on whether Shakespeare is worthy of one, video at Encyclopædia Britannica, narrated by Wolfe
 Shakespeare Documented

Shakespearean scholars
Folger Shakespeare Library
American archivists
1971 births

Living people
Fellows of the Society of Antiquaries of London